Farid El Alagui (born 28 August 1985) is a retired French footballer who played as a striker. He began his career in the lower leagues in France and made his breakthrough as a professional player at Scottish First Division club Falkirk, where he scored 27 goals in 43 appearances in his only season with the club.

Playing career

Early career
El Alagui began his career in amateur leagues in his native France, plying his trade at FC Marmande 47 and Bergerac Foot. He moved to Moroccan top flight club Wydad Casablanca in 2009, winning the 2009–10 league championship in his first and only season with the club. In 2010, he returned to France and signed for CFA club SO Romorantin.

Falkirk
He made his first-team debut on 23 July 2011 in Falkirk's 2–1 win over Brechin City in the Scottish Challenge Cup. El Alagui scored his first goal for Falkirk in a 4–2 away win against Albion Rovers on 30 July. He started the 2011–12 season in fine goalscoring form for his new club, scoring 15 goals in 17 appearances up until 25 October 2011, including two goals in a 3–2 victory against SPL club Rangers in the Scottish League Cup. On 9 August, El Alagui scored the only goal of the game in a win over Dundee in the third round of the Scottish Challenge Cup. On 9 October, El Alagui scored a double in the Scottish Challenge Cup semi-final 3–0 win against Annan Athletic. In the January transfer window, El Alagui was linked with several clubs in England, with the likes of Crawley Town, making a bid for him twice, only to be rejected by Steven Pressley, describing the bid as 'derisory'. Farid El Alagui became famous among the Falkirk support for "Kissing the Coin" after every goal, the lucky coin being kept by the backroom staff at the touchline. In April 2012, he furthered his reputation with the Falkirk fans, after winning the Scottish Challenge Cup he jumped into the crowd to celebrate with the support. He was the second highest top scorer in Scottish football in 2011–12, with Gary Hooper scoring one more goal. Due to his impressive season, Farid became a cult hero amongst the Falkirk supporters. At the end of the season, El Alagui (along with teammate Michael McGovern) was nominated for PFA First Division Player of the Year, an award which El Alagui subsequently won. El Alagui was also named in the PFA First Division Team of the Year. He made 43 appearances and scored 27 goals during his only season with the club and departed in July 2012.

Brentford
League One club Brentford signed El Alagui on 3 July 2012 on a two-year deal, beating off interest from St Johnstone, Kilmarnock, several Championship clubs and clubs abroad. After joining Brentford, El Alagui said he turned down offers from two SPL clubs because manager Uwe Rösler persuaded him to join Brentford. On the opening game of the season, he made his debut, coming on for Sam Saunders, in a 0–0 draw against Bury. On 24 August 2012, he scored his first two Brentford goals in a 5–1 win over Crewe Alexandra. After the match, strike partner Clayton Donaldson had supported El Alagui to become the new Gary Alexander. On 8 September 2012, he scored a winning goal in a 1–0 win over Colchester United. In early-October, El Alagui suffered a serious knee injury, after colliding with Paul Jones in a match against Crawley Town and spent much of the rest of the season on the sidelines. He made his return from injury in the penultimate game of the season against Hartlepool United, replacing goalscorer Marcello Trotta after 75 minutes of a 1–1 draw. He made one substitute appearance during Brentford's unsuccessful playoff campaign. El Alagui finished the 2012–13 season having scored three goals in 12 appearances.

On 6 August 2013, El Alagui began his 2013–14 season by coming on as a substitute for Emmanuel Oyeleke in the 54th minute of a League Cup first round match against Dagenham & Redbridge and scored two goals to help Brentford to a 3–2 extra time win. El Alagui scored a crucial injury time equaliser in a 1–1 draw with Gillingham on 17 August 2013. He scored two goals in Brentford's 5–3 Football League Trophy first round win over AFC Wimbledon on 3 September. In November and having started in only three of his first 12 appearances of the 2013–14 season, El Alagui expressed his frustration at being unable to force his way into Uwe Rösler's plans. El Alagui notched his sixth goal of the season in a 3–2 FA Cup second round defeat to Carlisle United on 7 December. News reports surfaced in mid-December that before his departure as manager, Rösler gave the go-ahead for El Alagui to move to Scottish Premiership club Partick Thistle on loan in January 2014, but El Alagui rubbished the speculation and reaffirmed his commitment to Brentford. What would be El Alagui's final appearance for the Bees came in a 3–1 victory over Milton Keynes Dons on 29 December, replacing Marcello Trotta after 81 minutes. El Alagui made 18 appearances and scored six goals during the 2013–14 season. He made 30 appearances and scored 9 goals during his two seasons with the club, his time with the Bees largely disrupted by his knee injury suffered in October 2012.

Dundee United (loan)
On 8 January 2014, El Alagui moved to Scottish Premiership club Dundee United on loan until the end of the 2013–14 season. He made his debut against Inverness CT in a 1–1 draw, after coming on as a substitute for the injured Brian Graham, on 12 January. El Alagui scored his first goal for the club, in a 1–1 draw with Partick Thistle on 1 February 2014. He finished the season having scored three goals in 15 appearances and, as he had been previously released by Brentford a week before his loan spell had finished, he left and became a free agent.

Hibernian
El Alagui signed a two-year contract with Scottish Championship club Hibernian in July 2014. He scored his first goal for the club on 9 August 2014, in a 2–1 home win against Livingston in the opening league match of the season. He scored again in the following match, the Edinburgh derby against Hearts on 17 August 2014, although it was only a consolation goal as Hibernian lost 2–1. On 30 August 2014, El Alagui had to go off injured in the first half as Hibernian lost 2–1 against Alloa Athletic, with the club fearing he had a ruptured an achilles' tendon. He then had surgery on the injury and it was expected he would be out for four to six months. On his return from injury, El Alagui came on as a substitute in an Edinburgh derby against Hearts. He scored in the dying minutes to wrap up a 2–0 victory for Hibernian.

Complications from the earlier surgery meant that El Alagui did not play for Hibs during the early part of the 2015–16 season, and at the end of his contract he was released by the club. Subsequently, El Alagui appeared as a trialist for Inverness CT and Dunfermline Athletic.

Dunfermline Athletic
After a trial period with Scottish Championship club Dunfermline Athletic, El Alagui signed a short-term contract with the club until January 2017. His first appearances for the Pars came from the subs bench, with his first full start coming against his former club Falkirk on 15 October 2016. El Alagui's scored a dramatic 85th-minute winner against St Mirren in a match that ended 4–3 to Dunfermline. Further goals in a 2–1 victory against Queen's Park in the Scottish Challenge Cup helped the club progress to the next round. El Alagui scored all three goals in the match, claiming an unusual hat-trick. El Alagui's final appearance for the club came as a late substitute against Ayr United.

After turning down a new contract with the club, El Alagui departed Dunfermline on 23 January 2017, with the intention of moving to play in Asia. In his brief spell with the club, El Alagui's made a total of 16 appearances for the Pars, with the majority coming as a substitute. Although he scored only four times in his four months with the club, three of these goals gave the club important wins over St Mirren and Queen's Park.

Ayr United
El Alagui subsequently signed for fellow Scottish Championship club Ayr United on 7 February 2017, on a contract until the end of the 2016–17 season. He subsequently scored goals at Somerset Park against Raith Rovers and against Dumbarton whilst also scoring a consolation goal against St Mirren. El Alagui was released by Ayr at the end of the 2016–17 season, following their relegation to Scottish League One.

Edinburgh City
After spending a number of months without a club, El Alagui played as a trialist for Scottish League Two club Edinburgh City on 4 November 2017, in a match against Stirling Albion. Shortly after, he signed a deal with the club until the end of the 2017–18 season. He left the club at the end of his contract in May 2018. After a final season with hometown club FC Marmande 47, El Alagui retired from football on 8 June 2019.

Coaching career 
As of January 2020, El Alagui was working as U16 coach at FC Marmande 47.

Career statistics

Honours
Falkirk
Scottish Challenge Cup: 2011–12

References

External links
 (Falkirk: misspelt surname)

1985 births
Living people
Association football forwards
Wydad AC players
SO Romorantin players
Falkirk F.C. players
Brentford F.C. players
Dundee United F.C. players
Scottish Football League players
English Football League players
Scottish Professional Football League players
French footballers
French expatriate footballers
Expatriate footballers in Scotland
Expatriate footballers in England
Hibernian F.C. players
Bergerac Périgord FC players
Dunfermline Athletic F.C. players
Ayr United F.C. players
F.C. Edinburgh players
FC Marmande 47 players
French expatriate sportspeople in England
Expatriate footballers in Morocco
French expatriate sportspeople in Morocco
French expatriate sportspeople in Scotland
French sportspeople of Moroccan descent
Footballers from Bordeaux